See No Evil, the 8th installment of the Hardy Boys Casefiles paperback series, was published in 1987.

See No Evil is book 1 in what fans call ‘’’’The Bayport Corruption Storyline’’’’.  The other two books in the storyline are #16 Line Of Fire and #55 Beyond The Law.

Plot summary
The plot involves Frank's girlfriend Callie Shaw attempting to join the boys in their crime fighting escapades, and centers around a top-secret codebook and a network of fraud, corruption and murder.

References

The Hardy Boys books
1987 American novels
1987 children's books